Dudley Dudley may refer to:
Dudley Dudley (politician) (born 1936), political activist in New Hampshire
Dudley Dudley (wrestler) (born 1968), American professional wrestler